Andrés Juan Arroyo Romero (born 20 January 2002) is a Colombian footballer who currently plays as a midfielder for Deportivo Cali.

A native of Montería, Arroyo's mother died when he was six months old and his father moved to Canada. His uncle and grandmother raised him, and supported Arroyo as he played youth football. Arroyo joined Deportivo Cali's youth system in 2016, and he would make his professional debut with the club's senior team in 2019.

Career statistics

Club

Notes

References

2002 births
Living people
Colombian footballers
Colombia youth international footballers
Association football midfielders
Categoría Primera A players
Deportivo Cali footballers
People from Montería
21st-century Colombian people